Aloud 'n' Live is the debut studio album by Australian pop group Hush. The album peaked at No. 40 on the Australian charts.

Reception
Ian Cross of The Canberra Times observed that their "sound is simple, hard rock and roll, yet it has a sense of originality about it. A great deal of its appeal is generated by the wild stage act. Dressed in colorful costumes the members dance around the stage involving themselves and, their audience."

Track listing

Charts

References 

1973 debut albums
Hush (band) albums
Warner Records albums